Nationality words link to articles with information on the nation's poetry or literature (for instance, Irish or France).

Events
October 19 – Jonathan Swift, Irish satirist and Dean of St Patrick's Cathedral, Dublin, dies aged 78. His body is laid out in public for the people of Dublin to pay their last respects, and he is buried, in accordance with his wishes, in his cathedral by Esther Johnson's side, with his own epitaph: Ubi sæva Indignatio/Ulterius/Cor lacerare nequit ("Where savage indignation can no longer lacerate the heart"). His death marks the end of the Scriblerus Club and the effective end of the age of Augustan poetry.

Works published
 John Adams, Poems on Several Occasions, Biblical verse paraphrases, devotional works and nonreligious poems; English Colonial America
 Mark Akenside, Odes on Several Subjects, published anonymously
 John Brown, An Essay on Satire: Occasion'd by the death of Mr. Pope, published anonymously; Alexander Pope died May 30, 1744
 John Gilbert Cooper, The  Power of Harmony, published anonymously
 Charles Jennens, Belshazzar: An oratorio, verse and music; performed in March; music by Handel
 Samuel Madden, Boulter's Monument, "Assisted by Samuel Johnson", according to The Concise Oxford Chronology of English Literature
 Moses Mendes, translator, Henry and Blanche; or, The Revengful Marriage, from the French of Alain-René Lesage
 Glocester Ridley, Jovi Eleutherio; or, An Offering to Liberty, published anonymously
 Thomas Scott, England's Danger and Duty, published anonymously
 William Thompson, Sickness, first two books (Book 3, 1746)

Births
Death years link to the corresponding "[year] in poetry" article:
 January 18 – Caterino Mazzolà (died 1806), Italian poet and librettist
 February 2 – Hannah More (died 1833), English religious writer, poet, play and philanthropist
 February 20 – Henry James Pye (died 1813), English Poet Laureate
 March 4 (bapt.) – Charles Dibdin (died 1814), English musician, dramatist, novelist, poet, actor and songwriter
 July 5 – Carl Arnold Kortum (died 1824), German writer, poet and physician
 July 26 – Henry Mackenzie (died 1831), Scottish novelist, writer and poet
 October 12 – Félix María de Samaniego (died 1801), Spanish fabulist
 October 13 (bapt.) – William Crowe (died 1829), English poet and academic
 November 9 – William Hayley (died 1820), English poet and writer, best known as the friend and biographer of William Cowper
 December 10 – Thomas Holcroft (died 1809), English dramatist, poet and miscellaneous writer
 Also – Charles Morris (died 1838), British army officer and songwriter

Deaths
Death years link to the corresponding "[year] in poetry" article:
 Spring – William Meston (born 1688), Scottish poet
 May 28 – Jonathan Richardson (born 1667), English portrait painter and poet
 June – Pierre des Maizeaux (born 1673), French writer, translator, biographer and poet
 September 11 – Mary Chandler (born 1687), English milliner and poet
 October 19 – Jonathan Swift (born 1667), Irish cleric, satirist, essayist, political pamphleteer and poet
 November 16 – William Broome (born 1689), English poet and translator

See also
Poetry
List of years in poetry
List of years in literature

 18th century in poetry
 18th century in literature
 Augustan poetry

Notes

18th-century poetry
Poetry